Carman Hall is a dormitory at Columbia University.

Carman Hall may also refer to:

Carman Hall (Eastern Illinois University), a dormitory
Carman Hall (Illinois Institute of Technology), a dormitory